Tezeta is a music genre in Ethiopia and Eritrea in ballad form.

Tezeta may also refer to:
 "Tezeta (Nostalgia)", a song by Mulatu Astatke
 "Tezeta", a song by King Gizzard & the Lizard Wizard from their 2017 album Sketches of Brunswick East